Rumquyusi (also Romanized as Rūm Qūyūsī; also known as Orūm Qūyūsī) is a village in Zolbin Rural District, Yamchi District, Marand County, East Azerbaijan Province, Iran. At the 2006 census, its population was 33, in 6 families.

References 

Populated places in Marand County